James Dewar (1842–1923) was a Scottish chemist and physicist.

James Dewar may also refer to:
 James Dewar (musician) (1942–2002), Scottish bassist and vocalist
 James Dewar (baker) (1897–1985), American inventor of the Twinkie snack cake
 James Dewar (judge) (1797–1830), British jurist and the Chief Justice of the Supreme Court of Bombay
 James Dewar (cricketer), English cricketer and British Army officer
 James Dewar (footballer), of Everton F.C. season 1892–93

See also
 James Dewar Bourdillon, British civil servant
 Jim Dewar (disambiguation)